Gorenja Vas pri Polici is a small settlement in the hills north of Polica in the Municipality of Grosuplje in central Slovenia. The area is part of the historical region of Lower Carniola. The municipality is now included in the Central Slovenia Statistical Region.

Name
The name of the settlement was changed from Gorenja  vas to Gorenja  vas pri Polici in 1953. In the past the German name was Oberdorf.

Cultural heritage
A small chapel-shrine in the village is dedicated to the Virgin Mary and was built in 1911.

References

External links

Gorenja Vas pri Polici on Geopedia

Populated places in the Municipality of Grosuplje